Advent Sunday, also called the First Sunday of Advent or First Advent Sunday, among the Western Christian Churches, is the first day of the liturgical year and the start of the season of Advent.

On the First Sunday of Advent, Christians start lighting their Advent wreaths, and praying their Advent daily devotional; believers may also erect their Christmas tree or Chrismon tree, light a Christingle, as well as engage in other ways of preparing for Christmas, such as setting up Christmas decorations, a custom that is sometimes done liturgically through a hanging of the greens ceremony.

Background 
In Lutheran, Anglican, and Methodist churches the celebrant wears violet-coloured or blue vestments on this day, and the first violet or blue Advent candle is lit in the worship service.

Likewise, in the Roman Rite of the Catholic Church, Advent also "begins with First Vespers (Evening Prayer I) of the Sunday that falls on or closest to 30 November and it ends before First Vespers (Evening Prayer I) of Christmas". The colour violet or purple is used in Advent, but where it is the practice the colour rose may be used  on Gaudete Sunday (Third Sunday of Advent).

In the Ambrosian Rite and the Mozarabic Rite, the First Sunday in Advent comes two weeks earlier than in the Roman, being on the Sunday after St. Martin's Day (11 November), six weeks before Christmas.

Advent Sunday is the fourth Sunday before Christmas Day. This is equivalent to the Sunday nearest to St. Andrew's Day, 30 November. It can fall on any date between 27 November and 3 December. When Christmas Day is a Monday, Advent Sunday will fall on its latest possible date. It is possible to compute the date of Advent Sunday by adding three days to the date of the last Thursday of November; it can also be computed as the Sunday before the first Thursday of December.

See also

 Stir-up Sunday

References

Sunday
Christian Sunday observances
November observances
December observances